Kezab Rural District is in Khezrabad District of Ashkezar County, Yazd province, Iran. At the National Census of 2006, its population was 2,257 in 701 households. There were 4,198 inhabitants in 1,086 households at the following census of 2011. At the most recent census of 2016, the population of the rural district was 4,012 in 877 households. The largest of its 108 villages was Hamaneh, with 377 people.

References 

Ashkezar County

Rural Districts of Yazd Province

Populated places in Yazd Province

Populated places in Ashkezar County